William Alexander Henry (December 30, 1816 – May 3, 1888) was a Canadian lawyer, politician, and judge.  He was one of the Fathers of Confederation and one of the first judges of the Supreme Court of Canada.

Henry was born in Halifax, Nova Scotia. Shortly afterward, his family moved to Antigonish. He attended Halifax High School then studied law and was admitted to the bar. He was married twice (1840 and 1850). His two sons were William Alexander Henry Jr., a successful Halifax lawyer and Hugh MacD Henry. The elder W. A. Henry served as a cabinet minister in Nova Scotia in governments led by both the Liberals and the Conservatives. He represented the Antigonish region almost continuously from 1840 to 1867 and was appointed attorney general in 1864.

Henry was a strong believer in the benefits that could be derived from a British American union such as free trade  and the construction of the Intercontinental Railway. Henry was a delegate to all three Confederation Conferences, and upon approval by the union in the Spring of 1866, he travelled to the London Conference as part of the delegation mandated to compose the legislation. The Nova Scotia delegates voted to accept the Quebec Resolutions into the British North America Act, 1867 but Henry objected to the limitation on the number of Senate seats. He also supported the unsuccessful efforts to have the existence of Roman Catholic separate schools entrenched in the Act. He was one of the attorneys general who helped frame the language. However, it is an unproved tradition that he drafted the BNA Act.

After Confederation, Henry suffered defeat in his own district for the first time in 24 years. He returned to private practice in Halifax and was elected mayor of the city in 1870. Although he was denied a judgeship in Nova Scotia, Henry was one of the first appointed to the newly created Supreme Court of Canada in 1875. He died in Ottawa, Ontario.

Henry was a Freemason of St. John’s Lodge, No. 161 (England) in Halifax, and affiliated with Civil Service Lodge No. 148 (Ontario) of Ottawa on March 13, 1883.

Henry House in Halifax, which served as Henry's residence from 1854 to 1864, was designated a National Historic Site in 1969 due in part to its association with Henry.

Election results

Footnotes

External links
 Supreme Court of Canada Biography

1816 births
1888 deaths
Canadian Presbyterians
Canadian people of Ulster-Scottish descent
Fathers of Confederation
Justices of the Supreme Court of Canada
Mayors of Halifax, Nova Scotia
Attorneys General of the Colony of Nova Scotia
People from Antigonish County, Nova Scotia
Persons of National Historic Significance (Canada)
Nova Scotia pre-Confederation MLAs
Canadian Freemasons